After the Rain is the debut album of the American rock group Nelson, released by DGC Records in 1990. The album was a commercial success, peaking at number 17 on the Billboard 200 and spending 64 weeks on the charts. It contained the #1 hit, "(Can't Live Without Your) Love and Affection" which was also a gold single. The follow-up single, "After the Rain", also reached the Hot 100's top 10, peaking at #6 in February 1991. The album was eventually certified double platinum by RIAA.

Writing and composition
Matthew and Gunnar Nelson decided to approach Geffen Records for a record deal. They began talks with A&R executive John Kalodner. According to Gunnar, they met with Kalodner "every month for a year", during which he filtered the songs they brought him until they had enough for an album. Most of the songs of the album were co-written with Marc Tanner, who was introduced to the band by Tom Vickers. Gunnar Nelson described the collaborating process in an interview as "magical" and praised Tanner for being "very supportive of our own instincts and our melodic sense". Tanner also produced the album.

After a year of meeting with Kalodner without being signed, Matthew and Gunnar met with him alone, against the wishes of their managers, and played an acoustic version of "(Can't Live Without Your) Love and Affection". Kalodner was so impressed that the band was signed the next day. As they prepared to record, Matthew and Gunnar started assembling a band. They settled on drummer Bobby Rock, Joey Cathcart, Brett Garsed, and Paul Mirkovich. Mirkovich also contributed an "Interlude" to the album.

In the making of the album, there were several issues in creating the album. One was that Gunnar could not play guitar. Gunnar stated "But what if I took a year off and all I did for that year was play guitar for 10 hours a day, every day?" Gunnar ended up studying and learning how to play. Another issue was their songwriting. Then another issue was the producers for the album: they had to fight the label to get Tanner behind production, and they were initially supposed to work with Duane Baron and John Purdell, which both never worked out. Eventually, they worked with Tanner and co-producer David Thoener, who helped shape Nelson's influences into a modern, radio-friendly sound.

Recording
After the Rain was recorded at Cherokee Studios in Los Angeles, and Studio B in Hollywood. According to Gunnar Nelson, they weren't "intimidated" by the process, despite being relatively new to the industry. He also credits co-writer and producer Marc Tanner for keeping them focused.

According to the Nelsons, Geffen producer John Kalodner "basically let us do our own thing". Gunnar has said that Kalodner's process of filtering songs before signing them helped them sort out their material and made it easy for them to come up with the songs for the album.

Reception
After the Rain was released on June 26, 1990, and became an instant success, peaking at #17 on the Billboard 200. It also demonstrated staying power, remaining in the charts for 64 weeks. The album was eventually certified double platinum by RIAA after selling more than 2,000,000 copies. 

As a result of the success of the album, the band began a World Tour with over 300 concerts.

Aftermath
After finishing the touring cycle for After the Rain, the band found themselves in massive debt despite the album's success. Nelson returned to the studio and recorded their second album, Imaginator, but it was rejected by their producer and the label for being too dark and heavy. Shelving that album, the band recorded a new collection of songs which became their second release Because They Can 5 years after their debut in 1995. By this time fans had moved on, and the record failed to chart, bringing to Nelson's relationship with the label to an end.

Track listing

Personnel

Nelson
Matthew Nelson – lead and back-up vocals, bass, electric, 12-string, and acoustic guitars
Gunnar Nelson – lead and back-up vocals, rhythm, 12-string, gut and acoustic guitars, solos on "Only Time Will Tell" and "Will You Love Me?"
Brett Garsed – all intercontinental lead guitars, rhythm, acoustic 6 and 12-strings, back-up vocals
Paul Mirkovich – all keyboards, grand piano, strings, back-up vocals
Bobby Rock – drums
Joey Cathcart – rhythm guitar, back-up vocals (died in May 2021)

Production
John Kalodner – producer
Marc Tanner – producer
David Thoener – producer, mixer, engineer
David Holman – additional mixing
Jack Benson – recording assistant at Cherokee Studios, Los Angeles, California
Leon Granados – recording assistant at Studio B, Hollywood, California
Nick Els – recording assistant at Studio B, Hollywood, California
Rick Norman – assistant mixer
Scotty Ralston – assistant mixer
Greg Fulginiti – mastering
David Donnelly – mastering supervisor
Marc Greene – pre-production
Robert O. Ragland – synclavier arrangement on "Only Time Will Tell" and "I Can Hardly Wait"
Stephen Klong – drums and programming
Scott Douglas MacLachlan – background vocals
Larry Mazer – management

Art
Gabrielle Raumberger – art direction and design
Lyn Bradley – design
Dennis Keeley and Michael Lavine – photography
Matthew Nelson, Gunnar Nelson, and Diane Estelle – clothing image concept
Diane Estelle – clothes design
Gail Ananighian and Marie Blom – assistants
Kohlene Hendrickson – symbology

Charts

Album

Singles

Certifications

Notes

Citations

Metal Sludge. Retrieved 2021-05-03.

Sources
 

1990 debut albums
Nelson (band) albums
DGC Records albums